Daniel Schweizer (born 1953), founded the Zurich Symphony Orchestra (S-O-Z) after his music study in violin, cello, and directing . He had his debut as a conductor in 1981. Today the S-O-Z belongs to the cultural life of the city Zurich. It survived mainly because the orchestra is able to offer a wide variety of music.

The formation and development of the orchestra has been achieved in his responsibility as chief conductor. He combines musical rarities and contemporary compositions with the classical repertoire of baroque, classical and romantic music. His works, dedicated to the premieres of contemporary composers, win widespread acclaim. Thus he is often invited to collaborate with other professional orchestras in Switzerland.

Daniel Schweizer approaches the phenomenon music with a descriptive objectification of tunes. This provides him a conscious base for his praxis to build himself bridges to the various styles of the symphonic. Quintessential point of his criteria for practical conversion is not primarily historical environment, but musical essence.

As of today, the orchestra performs two regular concert series in the Tonhalle in Zurich besides many other performances all around Switzerland and abroad. Daniel Schweizer's international achievements cover concerts at festivals in Spain and Portugal, as well as invitations as guest conductor to orchestras all around the world. A broad range of CD-productions gives proof of his musical activities.

Major orchestras maestro Schweizer has conducted are Orchestra Guido Cantelli Milano of Italy, Singapore Symphony Orchestra of Singapore, Seoul Philharmonic Orchestra of Korea and National Symphony Orchestra of Ukraine.

Personal Homepage: http://www.ds-m.com or http://www.danielschweizermusic.com
Project Orchestra: http://www.ods-productions.com/

Swiss conductors (music)
Male conductors (music)
1953 births
Living people
21st-century conductors (music)
21st-century male musicians